The term Austrian Bosnia may refer to:

 Austro-Hungarian rule in Bosnia and Herzegovina (1878-1918)
 Austrian rule in northern Bosnia, under the Treaty of Požarevac (1718-1739)

See also 
 Austrian (disambiguation)
 Bosnia (disambiguation)